Josef Beránek (born 25 October 1969) is a Czech former professional ice hockey player and coach. He was selected in the fourth round of the 1989 NHL Entry Draft, 78th overall, by the Edmonton Oilers. He has extensive professional playing experience, in the Czech Republic, the AHL, and the NHL. At the NHL level, he has played for the Oilers, Philadelphia Flyers, Vancouver Canucks, and Pittsburgh Penguins. He ended his playing career with HC Slavia Praha in the Czech Republic. In 1998, Beránek was part of the Czech Republic's gold-medal winning Olympic ice hockey team.

Career statistics

Regular season and playoffs

International

Transactions 
January 16, 1993 - Edmonton trades Beranek and Greg Hawgood to Philadelphia in exchange for Brian Benning
February 15, 1995 - Philadelphia trades Beranek to Vancouver in exchange for Shawn Antoski
March 18, 1997 - Vancouver trades Beranek to Pittsburgh in exchange for future considerations.
June 16, 1998 - Pittsburgh trades Beranek to Edmonton in exchange for Tony Hrkac and Bobby Dollas
March 14, 2000 - Edmonton trades Beranek to Pittsburgh in exchange for German Titov

External links 
 

1969 births
Living people
Cape Breton Oilers players
Czech ice hockey centres
Czechoslovak ice hockey centres
Edmonton Oilers draft picks
Edmonton Oilers players
HC Litvínov players
HK Dukla Trenčín players
HC Slavia Praha players
Ice hockey players at the 1998 Winter Olympics
Medalists at the 1998 Winter Olympics
Olympic gold medalists for the Czech Republic
Olympic ice hockey players of the Czech Republic
Olympic medalists in ice hockey
People from Litvínov
Philadelphia Flyers players
Pittsburgh Penguins players
Vancouver Canucks players
VHK Vsetín players
Sportspeople from the Ústí nad Labem Region
Czechoslovak expatriate sportspeople in Canada
Czech expatriate ice hockey players in Canada
Czech expatriate ice hockey players in the United States